The 2012 USA Pro Cycling Challenge was the second edition of the USA Pro Cycling Challenge stage race. The race took place from August 20–26, and was rated as a 2.HC event on the UCI America Tour.

Americans swept the podium, with Christian Vande Velde winning the race, Tejay van Garderen finishing second, and Levi Leipheimer finishing third.

Participating teams
Included in the participating team rosters were many of the top 2012 Tour de France riders; Vincenzo Nibali (3rd), Tejay van Garderen (5th), Cadel Evans (7th), Janez Brajkovič (9th), Andreas Klöden (11th), Chris Horner (13th), Levi Leipheimer (32nd), and Christian Vande Velde (60th). The USA Pro Cycling Challenge invited six UCI ProTeams, and UCI Professional Continental Teams; as well as five UCI Continental Teams.

UCI ProTeams
 
 
 
 
 
 

UCI Professional Continental Teams
 
 
 
 
 
 

UCI Continental Teams
 
 EPM–UNE

Stage Results

Stage 1
August 20, 2012 — Durango, to Telluride, 

The opening road race for the pro challenge began in Durango.

Stage 2
August 21, 2012 — Montrose to Crested Butte,

Stage 3
August 22, 2012 — Gunnison to Aspen,

Stage 4
August 23, 2012 — Aspen to Beaver Creek,

Stage 5
August 24, 2012 — Breckenridge to Colorado Springs,

Stage 6
August 25, 2012 — Golden to Boulder,

Stage 7
August 26, 2012 — Denver, 

The final stage was an individual time trial held through the streets of downtown Denver.

Classification leadership

General classification

References

External links

2012
2012 in road cycling
2012 in American sports
2012 in sports in Colorado
August 2012 sports events in the United States